Ashraf Waheed Al Sebaie  (born 5 July 1991) is a Bahraini professional footballer who plays as a goalkeeper for Manama. He was part of Bahrain's squad for the 2015 AFC Asian Cup.

References 

1989 births
Living people
Bahraini footballers
Manama Club players
Bahrain international footballers
Association football goalkeepers
2015 AFC Asian Cup players
AFC Cup winning players